Meng Fanlong (born 5 February 1988) is a Chinese professional boxer who held the IBF Inter-Continental light-heavyweight title between 2017 and 2019.

Amateur career 
As an amateur, he represented China at the 2012 London Olympics, competing in the light-heavyweight division.

At the 2010 Asian Games (results) he beat two opponents before being outclassed 1:12 by Elshod Rasulov.

At the Asian Championships he lost the final to Kim Hyeong-kyu (KOR) 13:15. At the 2011 World Amateur Boxing Championships he beat three opponents before losing to Adilbek Niyazymbetov.

At the 2012 Olympics he defeated Ahmed Barki 17:8 but lost to Yamaguchi Falcão Florentino 17:17 on countback.

Professional career

Meng vs. Buglioni 
On 24 November, 2018, Meng fought and beat Frank Buglioni by technical knockout in the 5th round.

Meng vs. Deines 
In his next bout, Meng fought Adam Deines, who was ranked #5 by the IBF and #11 by the WBO at light heavyweight. Meng won the fight via unanimous decision.

Meng vs. Pascal 
Meng lost from Jean Pascal via unanimous decision in their 12 round contest. The scorecards read 111-116, 112-115, 113-114 in favor of Pascal.

Professional boxing record

References

External links
Bio
https://boxrec.com/en/proboxer/707917
Fanlong Meng - Profile, News Archive & Current Rankings at Box.Live

1988 births
Living people
People from Chifeng
Boxers at the 2012 Summer Olympics
Olympic boxers of China
Sportspeople from Inner Mongolia
Asian Games medalists in boxing
Boxers at the 2010 Asian Games
Chinese male boxers
Asian Games bronze medalists for China
Medalists at the 2010 Asian Games
Light-heavyweight boxers